Rudnica is a small settlement on the southern slopes of a hill with the same name, to the west of Olimje in the Municipality of Podčetrtek in eastern Slovenia. The area around Podčetrtek was traditionally part of the region of Styria. It is now included in the Savinja Statistical Region.

References

External links
Rudnica on Geopedia

Populated places in the Municipality of Podčetrtek